Johannes Polyander van den Kerckhoven (28 March 1568, in Metz – 4 February 1646, in Leiden)  was a Dutch Calvinist theologian, a Contra-Remonstrant but considered of moderate views.

Life
He was born at Metz, France. His father was from Ghent, but had gone into exile in Lorraine where he was a Protestant pastor. The family then moved to Heidelberg. He studied at Heidelberg under Franciscus Junius, graduating M.A. in 1589; and then for a doctorate in Geneva in 1590, under Theodore Beza.

He became French preacher at Dordrecht in 1591, and later succeeded Franz Gomarus as professor of theology at the University of Leiden, where he taught from 1611. Polyander was considered a conciliatory figure, in the aftermath of the affairs at Leiden of Jacobus Arminius and Conrad Vorstius.

His epitaph is displayed in the Pieterskerk, Leiden.

Family
His son was Johan Polyander, lord of Heenvliet.  He was a Dutch diplomat. He married Katherine Wotton, Countess of Chesterfield. She was the widow of Henry Stanhope, Lord Stanhope.

Works
He was invited by the States of Holland to revise the Dutch translation of the Bible (the Statenvertaling), and it was he who edited the canons of the synod of Dort (1618–1619). His published works include:

 Responsio ad sophismata A. Cocheletii doctoris surbonnistae (1610), against the Carmelite Anastasius Cochelet, an opponent of Justus Lipsius; 
 Dispute contre l'adoration des reliques des Saints trespasses (1611);
 Explicatio somae prophetae (1625).

References

Further reading
 A. J. Lamping  (1980), Johannes Polyander, een dienaar van Kerk en Universiteit

External links

Sermon

1568 births
1646 deaths
Dutch members of the Dutch Reformed Church
Participants in the Synod of Dort
Heidelberg University alumni
Academic staff of Leiden University
Dutch Calvinist and Reformed theologians
17th-century Calvinist and Reformed theologians
Clergy from Heidelberg